Michael Christopher Leonard (born 9 May 1959) is a retired English football player who played in Hong Kong First Division League. He played the position of goalkeeper and was regarded as the best goalkeeper in Hong Kong at the time. In 1994, he made his debut in Hong Kong First Division League for Instant-Dict. In 1998, he moved to another giant team South China.

In 2000, he retired from professional football due to severe injury.

References

 Yahoo! Knowledge 南華係90年代o既keeper係邊個? (in Chinese)
 南華 (in Chinese)

1959 births
Living people
English footballers
Halifax Town A.F.C. players
Notts County F.C. players
Chesterfield F.C. players
Double Flower FA players
South China AA players
Hong Kong First Division League players
Expatriate footballers in Hong Kong
Association football goalkeepers
English expatriate sportspeople in Hong Kong
English expatriate footballers
English Football League players
New Zealand women's national football team managers